Marta Míguez Telle (born March 3, 1973, in Louredo Cortegado, Ourense) is a retired female javelin thrower from Spain. She set her personal best (59.43 metres) on July 21, 2001, in Valencia, Spain.

Achievements

References

sports-reference

1973 births
Living people
Spanish female javelin throwers
Athletes (track and field) at the 2000 Summer Olympics
Olympic athletes of Spain
People from O Ribeiro
Sportspeople from the Province of Ourense
Mediterranean Games bronze medalists for Spain
Mediterranean Games medalists in athletics
Athletes (track and field) at the 1997 Mediterranean Games
Athletes (track and field) at the 2001 Mediterranean Games